Senator Pyle may refer to:

Dennis Pyle (born 1961), Kansas State Senate
Gladys Pyle (1890–1989), U.S. Senator from South Dakota